Francis Bagnal Kidger Tucker (30 April 1923 – 4 April 2008) was a South African rally driver, who was the 1966 South African Rally Drivers Champion.

Tucker was heavily involved with the development of the Kyalami racetrack and served as Steward for all the Grand Prix events at Kyalami until SAMRAC sold the circuit. He was also involved with the organization of the Castrol International Rally and a recipient of the Motorsport South African (MSA) Lifetime Achievement award.

References

South African rally drivers
1923 births
2008 deaths
Sportspeople from Johannesburg